The Affair of the Poisons (French: l'affaire des poisons) was a major murder scandal in France during the reign of King Louis XIV. Between 1677 and 1682, a number of prominent members of the aristocracy were implicated and sentenced on charges of poisoning and witchcraft. The scandal reached into the inner circle of the king. It led to the execution of 36 people.

Context and origin 
The case began in 1675 after the trial of Madame de Brinvilliers, who was accused of having conspired with her lover, army captain Godin de Sainte-Croix, to poison her father Antoine Dreux d'Aubray in 1666 and two of her brothers, Antoine d'Aubray and François d'Aubray, in 1670, in order to inherit their estates. There were also rumours that she had poisoned poor people during her visits to hospitals.

After being accused, she fled but was arrested in Liège. Madame de Brinvilliers was tortured and confessed, was sentenced to death, and on 17 July was tortured with the water cure (forced to drink sixteen pints of water) and then beheaded, and her body burned at the stake. Her alleged accomplice Sainte-Croix did not face charges because he had died of natural causes in 1672.

The sensational trial drew attention to other mysterious deaths, starting rumours. Prominent people, including Louis XIV, became alarmed that they might be poisoned.

Implications and investigation 

The affair proper opened in February 1677 after the arrest of Magdelaine de La Grange on charges of forgery and murder. La Grange appealed to François Michel Le Tellier, Marquis of Louvois, claiming that she had information about other crimes of high importance. Louvois reported to the king, who told Gabriel Nicolas de la Reynie, who, among other things, was the chief of the Paris police, to root out the poisoners. La Reynie sought to calm the king. The subsequent investigation of potential poisoners led to accusations of witchcraft, murder and more.

Authorities rounded up a number of fortune tellers and alchemists who were suspected of selling not only divinations, séances and aphrodisiacs, but also "inheritance powders" (a euphemism for poison). Some of them confessed under torture and gave authorities lists of their clients, who had allegedly bought poison to get rid of their spouses or rivals in the royal court.

The most famous case was that of the midwife Catherine Deshayes Monvoisin or La Voisin, who was arrested in 1679 after she was incriminated by the poisoner Marie Bosse. La Voisin implicated several important courtiers. These included Olympia Mancini, the Countess of Soissons, her sister, the Duchess of Bouillon, François Henri de Montmorency, Duke of Luxembourg and, most importantly, the king's mistress, Madame de Montespan.

Questioned while intoxicated, La Voisin claimed that Montespan had bought aphrodisiacs and performed black masses with her in order to gain and keep the king's favour over rival lovers. She had worked with a priest named Étienne Guibourg. There was no evidence beyond her confessions, but bad reputations followed these people afterwards. Eleanor Herman, in her book Sex with Kings, claims that the police, given reports of "babies' bones", uncovered the remains of 2,500 infants in La Voisin's garden. However, Anne Somerset disputes this in her book The Affair of the Poisons and states there is no mention of the garden being searched for human remains.

Also involved in the scandal was Eustache Dauger de Cavoye, the eldest living scion of a prominent noble family. Cavoye was disinherited by his family when, in an act of debauchery, he chose to celebrate Good Friday with a black mass. Upon his disinheritance, he opened a lucrative trade in "inheritance powders" and aphrodisiacs. He mysteriously disappeared after the abrupt ending of Louis's official investigation in 1678. Because of this and his name, he was once suspected of being the Man in the Iron Mask. However, this theory has fallen out of favour because it is now known that he was imprisoned by his family in 1679 in the Prison Saint-Lazare.

The end of the trial 
La Voisin was sentenced to death for witchcraft and poisoning, and burned at the stake on 22 February 1680. Marshal Montmorency-Bouteville was briefly jailed in 1680, but was later released and became a captain of the guard. Minister Jean-Baptiste Colbert helped to hush things up.

De La Reynie re-established the special court, the Chambre Ardente ("burning court"), to judge cases of poisoning and witchcraft. It investigated a number of cases, including many connected to nobles and courtiers in the king's court. Over the years, the court sentenced 34 people to death for poisoning or witchcraft.  Two died under torture and several courtiers were exiled.  The court was abolished in 1682, because the king could not risk the publicity of such scandal. To this, Police Chief Reynie said "the enormity of their crimes proved their safeguard."

Aftermath 
Perhaps the most important effect of the scandal and subsequent persecutions was the expulsion from France of the Countess of Soissons. Her son remained in France, only to find that his mother's high-profile disgrace prevented him from realising his personal ambitions, as he was effectively barred from pursuing a military career. He would eventually leave France, nurturing a profound grudge against Louis XIV, and enter the service of France's sworn enemies, the Habsburgs. Prince Eugene of Savoy, or Prinz Eugen, would, in time, come to be known as one of the greatest generals of the age and one of the factors behind the failure of Louis's bid for hegemony in Europe.

Suspects and sentences
The Poison Affair implicated 442 suspects: 367 orders of arrests were issued, of which 218 were carried out. Of the condemned, 36 were executed; five were sentenced to the galleys and 23 to exile. This excludes those who died in custody by torture or suicide. Additionally, many accused were never brought to trial, but placed outside of the justice system and imprisoned for life by a lettre de cachet.

Of the people who were condemned to perpetual imprisonment by lettre de cachet, six women were imprisoned at Château de Villefranche; 18 men at Château de Salces; 12 women at Belle-Île-en-Mer; ten men at Château de Besançon; 14 women at St Andre de Salins; and five women at Fort de Bains.

Non-clients
This lists those people of the Poison Affair who were sentenced or punished without verdict for having been professionally involved in criminal activity; as poisoners or occultists or in other ways associated with the organization of la Voisin. Their punishment is mentioned after their name and role.

Clients
This lists people involved in the Poison Affair by being clients of the professionals above. Their punishment is mentioned after their name and role.

Similar incidents 
In October 1702 Marie-Anne de La Ville was arrested for having created a new organisation similar to the one of la Voisin, but because of Affair of the Poisons, she and her colleagues were never brought to trial, but imprisoned without trial on a lettre de cachet.

In fiction
In 1907 French writer Victorien Sardou produced a play The Affair of the Poisons. This later provided the basis for a 1955 film adaptation of the same title directed by Henri Decoin. Marjorie Bowen's 1936 novel The Poisoners also revolves around the incident. 

The organisation of La Voisin and the Affair of the Poisons is portrayed in a novel by Judith Merkle Riley: The Oracle Glass (1994).

The Affair of the Poisons is the leading thread throughout the second season of the French-Canadian TV series Versailles. The series shows the courtiers being intoxicated with the powders and potions; even Madame de Montespan is portrayed as having a major role in the poisonings. In the fictionalization, La Voisin was altered to the character Agathe.

Scottish speed metal artist Hellripper's 2020 album titled The Affair of The Poisons contains lyrical themes based on the scandal.

See also
 Spana Prosecution, another 17th-century poison affair around a net of female poisoners, an Italian equivalent of the Affair of the Poisons.

References

Text
 
 
 
 
  Volumes IV 1663–1678, V 1678–1679 VI 1679–1681 VII 1681.
 Excerpts from Bastille trial records of Guibourg and LaVoisin (French and English translation)

Fiction

Video
 

1677 in France
1682 in France
1670s in France
1680s in France
17th century in Paris
Affair of the Poisons
Poison affair
Legal history of the Ancien Régime
Murder in 1677 
Murder in 1682
Murder in the 1670s
Murder in the 1680s
Poison affair
Poison affair
Serial murders in France